Andriy Mykolaiovych Odarchenko (born 2 November 1978) is a Ukrainian professor and politician currently serving as a People's Deputy of Ukraine from Ukraine's 170th electoral district since 29 August 2019. He is a member of Servant of the People.

Early life and career 
Andriy Mykolaiovych Odarchenko was born on 2 November 1978 in the city of Kharkiv, then a part of the Ukrainian Soviet Socialist Republic within the Soviet Union. He graduated from the Kharkiv State University of Food Technology and Trade in 2000, specialising in commodity science and commercial activity. In 2013, he again graduated from the Kharkiv State University of Food Technology and Trade, this time with a master's degree in economics and enterprising. He is a Doctor of Technical Sciences.

In 2011, he began working at the Kharkiv State University of Food Technology and Trade's faculty of trade, business, and customs management as the faculty's dean. In 2015, he additionally became a professor at the university's department of merchandising, quality management, and environmental protection. In his work as a professor, Odarchenko was responsible for three people becoming Candidates of Technical Science.

Political career 
Odarchenko ran in the 2019 Ukrainian parliamentary election as the candidate of Servant of the People in Ukraine's 170th electoral district. At the time of the election, he was an independent. He was successfully elected, winning 44.41% and therefore defeating the closest competitor, incumbent People's Deputy Dmytro Svyatash (who won 29.77% of the vote).

In the Verkhovna Rada, Odarchenko joined the Servant of the People parliamentary faction. He also joined the Verkhovna Rada Committee on Anti-Corruption Policies and the inter-factional associations Equal Rights, Blockchain4Ukraine, Odeshchyna, Anti-Raider Coalition, Slobozhanshchyna, and For Accelerated European Integration of Ukrainian Business.

Odarchenko was criticised during the COVID-19 pandemic in Ukraine by anti-corruption non-governmental organisation Chesno for delivering masks in his electoral district in what it regarded as an instance of convincing individuals to vote for him.<ref name=":1"</ref>

References 

Living people
1978 births
Ukrainian politicians
People from Kharkiv Oblast
People from Kharkiv
Servant of the People (political party) politicians